Anasa is a genus of leaf-footed bug in the Coreinae subfamily. The nine described species within this genus are:

 A. andresii
 A. armigera (Horned Squash Bug)
 A. bellator
 A. cornuta
 A. maculipes
 A. repetita
 A. scorbutica
 A. tristis (Squash Bug)
 A. uhleri

References 

  Bugguide.net. Genus Anasa - Squash Bugs

Coreini
Coreidae genera